Sisymbrium irio, the London rocket, is a plant in the family Brassicaceae. It is an annual herb exceeding three feet in height with open, slender stem branches. The flowers are small with four pale yellow petals. The basal leaves are broad and often lobed, while the upper leaves are linear in shape and up to four inches long. The fruit is a long narrow cylindrical silique which stays green when ripe. The younger pods overtop the flowers. When dried the fruit has small red oblong seeds.

The term "London" in the common name "London rocket" allegedly comes from its abundance after the Great Fire of London in 1666. Plants and seed must have been present in London prior to the fire but generally overlooked until their abundant appearance after the fire; Robert Morison, the physician to King Charles II, attributed their appearance to spontaneous generation when he observed that “these hot bitter plants with four petals and pods were produced spontaneously without seed by the ashes of the fire mixed with salt and lime.” [Mabey, Richard. "In Defence of Nature's Most Unloverd Plants." Chapter 10. HarperCollinsPublishers, 2010]
 
In contrast, Dr E J Salisbury, in his study of the bombsites of London after the Great Fire of 1940, "failed to find a single specimen, nor has any other reliable observer reported it", according to R. S. R. Fitter.

The term "Rocket" in the common name appears to be derived from the old Latin term "eruca" applied to several loosely-related plants in the cabbage family. [Mabey, Richard. "In Defence of Nature's Most Unloverd Plants." Chapter 10. HarperCollinsPublishers, 2010]

This species is considered a weed in the Southwestern United States and other regions where it has been introduced.

Uses
The leaves, seeds, and flowers are edible, with a spicy flavor similar to cultivated rocket. London rocket is used in the Middle East to treat coughs and chest congestion, to relieve rheumatism, to detoxify the liver and spleen, and to reduce swelling and clean wounds. The Bedouin use the leaf of London Rocket as a tobacco substitute. The cured pods can be placed in a basket with live coals and shaken until the pods are parched, then ground into meal and made into soup or stew.

Notes

References
  
 Ray, Jarren et al. (2005) "Moisture and Temperature Requirements for London Rocket (Sisymbrium irio) Emergence" Weed Science 53(2): pp. 187–192
 

irio
Plants described in 1753
Taxa named by Carl Linnaeus
Flora of Malta